The Auto Rest Garage is a building complex located in downtown Portland, Oregon, listed on the National Register of Historic Places.

It was designed by Portland architects Jacobberger and Smith to serve as a showroom for Stutz and Columbia Six
automobiles.

It has also been known as Medical Arts Garage.

See also
 National Register of Historic Places listings in Southwest Portland, Oregon

References

External links

1917 establishments in Oregon
Auto dealerships on the National Register of Historic Places
Automobile repair shops
Buildings designated early commercial in the National Register of Historic Places
National Register of Historic Places in Portland, Oregon
Transport infrastructure completed in 1917
Southwest Portland, Oregon
Portland Historic Landmarks
Transportation buildings and structures in Portland, Oregon